Daniela Carrandi Casillas (born 15 February 2000), known as Daniela Carrandi, is a Mexican professional football forward who currently plays for Liga MX Femenil team Atlético de San Luis.

Playing career

C.D. Guadalajara 

In 2017, Carrandi helped Chivas win the first professional women's football championship in the country in front of 32,466 spectators.

Carrandi scored in the 2017 Liguilla – Apertura semifinal round in the 92nd minute.

Atletico San Luis

Notes

References

External links
 
 Daniela Carrandi at C.D. Guadalajara Femenil 

2000 births
Living people
Mexican women's footballers
Footballers from Mexico City
Liga MX Femenil players
C.D. Guadalajara (women) footballers
Women's association football forwards
Mexican footballers